Hollick-Kenyon is a residential neighbourhood located in north east Edmonton, Alberta, Canada.  The neighbourhood is named for aviator Herbert Hollick-Kenyon.

According to the 2001 federal census, substantially all residential development in the neighbourhood occurred after 1990.

Nine out of every ten residences (91%), according to the 2005 municipal census, are single-family dwellings. The remaining one in ten residences (9%) are duplexes.  A substantial (97%) number of residences are owner-occupied.

It is bounded on the north by 167 Avenue, on the south by 153 Avenue, on the west by 59A Street, and on the east by 50 Street.

Demographics 

Surrounding neighbourhoods

References

External links 
 Hollick-Kenyon Neighbourhood Profile

Neighbourhoods in Edmonton